The term "Casa Presidencial" can refer to the following:
 Casa Presidencial (Costa Rica), the official residence of the President in Costa Rica.
 Casa Presidencial (El Salvador), the official residence of the President in El Salvador.
 Casa Presidencial (Guatemala), the official residence of the President in Guatemala.
 Casa Presidencial (Honduras), the official workplace of the President of Honduras.